The 2022–23 season is Queen of the South's first season back in the third tier of Scottish football, since they were promoted as champions from the Scottish Second Division at the end of the 2012-13 season, having spent the previous nine seasons in the Scottish Championship. Queens are also competing in the Challenge Cup, League Cup and the Scottish Cup.

Summary

Results and fixtures

Pre season

Scottish League One

Scottish League Cup

Scottish Challenge Cup

Scottish Cup

Player statistics

Captains

 
|-

|-   

|-

|-

|-

Squad 

|}

Disciplinary record

Top scorers
Last updated 18 March 2023

Clean sheets

{| class="wikitable" style="font-size: 95%; text-align: center"
|-
!width=15|
!width=15|
!width=15|
!width=150|Name
!width=80|Scottish Championship
!width=80|League Cup
!width=80|Challenge Cup
!width=80|Scottish Cup
!width=80|Total
|-
|1
|GK
|
|Max Currie
|4
|2
|2
|0
|8
|-
|13
|GK
|
|Scott Fox
|0
|0
|0
|0
|0
|-
|25
|GK
|
|Kevin Dabrowski
|2
|0
|0
|0
|2
|-
|30
|GK
|
|Charlie Cowie
|1
|0
|0
|0
|1
|-
|42
|GK
|
|Gordon Botterill
|0
|0
|0
|0
|0
|-
!colspan="4"|Total !! 7 !! 2 !! 2 !! 0 !! 11

Team statistics

Scottish League One

League table

Results by round

League Cup table

Management statistics
Last updated 18 March 2023

Transfers

Players in

Players out

See also
List of Queen of the South F.C. seasons

Notes

References

Queen of the South F.C. seasons
Queen of the South